Lisa Belluco, (born 20 July 1988 in Metz) is a French politician and a member of the French Parliament since the 2022 French legislative election.

References 

1988 births
Living people
21st-century French women politicians
Women members of the National Assembly (France)
Deputies of the 16th National Assembly of the French Fifth Republic
Europe Ecology – The Greens politicians